Eva Elizabeth Rodgerson (born June 21, 1945) is a Canadian politician, who was a member of the Legislative Assembly of Prince Edward Island from 2000 to 2007. She represented the electoral district of West Point-Bloomfield and was a member of the Progressive Conservative Party.

She was born Eva Elizabeth MacMillan in O'Leary, Prince Edward Island, the daughter of Hamel MacMillan and Helen Gay, and was educated at Holland College. She married Gordon Rodgerson in 1963. Rodgerson was a community development officer and was involved in the construction of the "Big Potato" in O'Leary. In 2008, she was awarded the Governor General's Caring Canadian Award for over thirty-five years of service to the community of O'Leary.

References 

Living people
1945 births
People from Prince County, Prince Edward Island
Progressive Conservative Party of Prince Edward Island MLAs
Women MLAs in Prince Edward Island
21st-century Canadian politicians
21st-century Canadian women politicians